Anadia bitaeniata, the two-banded anadia, is a species of lizard in the family Gymnophthalmidae. It is endemic to the Sierra de la Culata in the Andes of Venezuela.

References

Anadia (genus)
Reptiles of Venezuela
Endemic fauna of Venezuela
Reptiles described in 1903
Taxa named by George Albert Boulenger